In enzymology, a malonate-semialdehyde dehydrogenase is an enzyme that catalyzes the chemical reaction

3-oxopropanoate + NAD(P)+ + H2O  malonate + NAD(P)H + 2 H+

The 4 substrates of this enzyme are 3-oxopropanoate, NAD+, NADP+, and H2O, whereas its 4 products are malonate, NADH, NADPH, and H+.

This enzyme belongs to the family of oxidoreductases, specifically those acting on the aldehyde or oxo group of donor with NAD+ or NADP+ as acceptor.  The systematic name of this enzyme class is 3-oxopropanoate:NAD(P)+ oxidoreductase. This enzyme participates in beta-alanine metabolism.

References 

 

EC 1.2.1
NADPH-dependent enzymes
NADH-dependent enzymes
Enzymes of unknown structure